The Vice President of the Socialist Republic of Vietnam, known as Deputy Chairman of the Council of State from 1981 to 1992, is the deputy head of state of the Socialist Republic of Vietnam. The vice president is appointed on the recommendation of the president to the National Assembly. The president can also recommend the vice president's dismissal and resignation from office. Upon the president's recommendation, the vice president has to be approved by the National Assembly. The main duty of a vice president is to help the president in discharging his duties – in certain cases, the vice president can be empowered by
the president to replace him in the discharge of some of his duties. If the president can't discharge of his duties, the vice president becomes acting president (Tôn Đức Thắng, Nguyễn Hữu Thọ, Đặng Thị Ngọc Thịnh and Võ Thị Ánh Xuân  were acting presidents for a short period). In case of vacancy, the vice president will remain acting president until the National Assembly elects a new president.

While the office of vice president was first mentioned in the 1946 constitution, Tôn Đức Thắng became the first Vice President of Vietnam in 1960. The 1980 constitution renamed the office of vice president to Deputy Chairman of the Council of State. Unlike the 1946, 1959 and the present constitution, the 1980 constitution did not mentioned what kind of authority the office of vice president had — for instance, it was not mentioned if a vice president would take the responsibilities of acting head of state if the head of state was incapacitated. In 1992, the name for the post of deputy chairman of the Council of State was reverted to its original name; vice president. South Vietnam, under its 1967 constitution, also had a vice-president. Since 1992, the office of Vice President of Vietnam has traditionally been occupied by a woman, with two of them becoming acting President in the last decade.

Vice presidents of the Democratic Republic of Vietnam (1960–1976)

Vice presidents of the Socialist Republic of Vietnam (1976–present)

Vice presidents (1976–1981)

Deputy chairmen of the Council of State (1981–1992)

Vice presidents (1992–present)

Notes

References

Government of Vietnam
Politics of Vietnam
Vietnam